Morgan Renee Romano (born July 19, 1998) is an American model and beauty pageant titleholder who was crowned Miss USA 2022. Previously crowned Miss North Carolina USA 2022, Romano placed as the first runner-up at Miss USA, and took over the title after its original winner R'Bonney Gabriel was crowned Miss Universe 2022. Romano is the fourth woman from North Carolina to be crowned Miss USA.

Early life and education
Morgan Renee Romano was born on July 19, 1998 in Johnstown, New York. After completing high school, Romano moved to Columbia, South Carolina to enroll in the University of South Carolina, graduating with a degree in chemical engineering in 2020. Romano had decided to relocate to the Southern United States due to her dislike for the harsh winter weather in Upstate New York. Following her graduation, Romano relocated to Concord, North Carolina, where she began working as an application engineer for industrial equipment supplier RE Mason.

Pageantry
Romano first began competing in pageantry as a teenager in New York, placing as a runner-up at Miss New York's Outstanding Teen when she was in high school, at the encouragement of her mother. After relocating to South Carolina in 2016, Romano decided to return to pageantry, due to her desire to make more female friends as a female student in a male-dominated field. She later won the title of Miss Midlands, and competed at Miss South Carolina three times and Miss South Carolina USA one time, without winning the title.

Romano began competing in North Carolina pageantry after relocating there in 2020, placing as the second runner-up at Miss North Carolina USA 2021.

Miss USA 2022
After placing as the second runner-up at Miss North Carolina USA 2021, Romano opted to return to the competition the following year. The final was held on January 29, 2022, where Romano once again advanced to the top five, ultimately winning the title. As Miss North Carolina USA, Romano received the right to represent North Carolina at Miss USA 2022. Romano later crowned Jordyn McKey as her successor at Miss North Carolina USA 2023 on February 25, 2023.

Miss USA was held on October 3, 2022 in Reno, Nevada. During the competition, Romano advanced into the top sixteen, top twelve, top five, and ultimately placed as the first runner-up, behind winner R'Bonney Gabriel of Texas. During the competition, Romano adopted a platform promoting women in STEM fields. The pageant was ultimately marred in controversy, with allegations that Gabriel had received preferential treatment from pageant organizers throughout the duration of the competition.

Gabriel went on to be crowned Miss Universe 2022 in January 2023. Due to pageant protocol, she was unable to continue her reign as Miss USA after assuming her duties as Miss Universe, and her Miss USA title was passed down to Romano.

Notes

References

External links

1998 births
American beauty pageant winners
Living people
Miss USA winners
People from Concord, North Carolina
People from Johnstown, New York
University of South Carolina alumni